Johannes Käbin, also known by his Russified name Ivan Gustavovich Kebin (24 September 1905, Kalvi, Kreis Wierland, Governorate of Estonia, Russian Empire – 25 October 1999, Tallinn, Estonia) was an Estonian Soviet politician who led the Communist Party of Estonia from 1950 to 1978. Käbin was an ethnic Estonian but had been raised in Russia (so-called "Yestonian"), as his family had moved to Saint Petersburg in 1910. After the reindependence of Estonia till his death Käbin was a member of the Social Democratic Labour Party.

Biography 
Johannes Käbin was born in 1905 in Kalvi, Virumaa. In 1907, Käbin's family moved from Estonia to St. Petersburg, where his father died in the same year. In 1916, together with his mother and older sister, he moved to the village of Sussanino in Petrograd Province, where the family bought a small farm (0.27 hectares). In 1926 he entered the Leningrad School of Soviet and Party Construction. A year later, Käbin was appointed chairman of the Susanin Village Council of the Gatchina (Trotsky) district. He completed his studies from Institute of Red Professors in 1938.

Career 
He worked as a teacher in Moscow before returning to Estonia after the Second World War. Käbin later became the Deputy Head of the Propaganda and Agitation Department of the Central Committee of the EKP. In 1948, Käbin returned to be elected secretary of the Central Committee for Propaganda and Propaganda. In 1950, at the 8th Plenum, he was elected as First Secretary of the EKP. Initially a hardline Stalinist, he gradually became more moderate in the post-Stalin era but nevertheless remained devoted to the consolidation of Soviet rule in Estonia. He was in this position for more than 25 years, in part due the Kremlin's approval of his policies. He was the Chairman of the Supreme Soviet (head of state) from 1978 to 1983.

Later life 
After the restoration of independence, he remained in Estonia. He died in Tallinn in 1999 at the age of 94. He is buried in Metsakalmistu.

Personal life 
His son is the physicist Eduard Käbin (born 17 April 1945), who is a graduate of Moscow State University and is a Honorary Worker of Higher Professional Education of Russia.

Awards 
He received many awards, such as the:
Hero of Socialist Labour (1975)
Six Orders of Lenin (1950, 1955, 1958, 1965, 1971, 1975)
Order of the October Revolution (1973)
Two Orders of the Red Banner of Labour (1946, 1981)
Order of Friendship of Peoples (1985)
Medal "For Labour Valour" (1959)

References 

1905 births
1999 deaths
People from Viru-Nigula Parish
People from Kreis Wierland
Heads of the Communist Party of Estonia
Heads of state of the Estonian Soviet Socialist Republic
Estonian communists
Central Committee of the Communist Party of the Soviet Union members
Members of the Supreme Soviet of the Estonian Soviet Socialist Republic, 1951–1955
Members of the Supreme Soviet of the Estonian Soviet Socialist Republic, 1955–1959
Members of the Supreme Soviet of the Estonian Soviet Socialist Republic, 1959–1963
Members of the Supreme Soviet of the Estonian Soviet Socialist Republic, 1963–1967
Members of the Supreme Soviet of the Estonian Soviet Socialist Republic, 1967–1971
Members of the Supreme Soviet of the Estonian Soviet Socialist Republic, 1971–1975
Members of the Supreme Soviet of the Estonian Soviet Socialist Republic, 1975–1980
Members of the Supreme Soviet of the Estonian Soviet Socialist Republic, 1980–1985
Third convocation members of the Soviet of Nationalities
Fourth convocation members of the Soviet of the Union
Fifth convocation members of the Soviet of the Union
Sixth convocation members of the Soviet of the Union
Seventh convocation members of the Soviet of the Union
Eighth convocation members of the Soviet of Nationalities
Ninth convocation members of the Soviet of Nationalities
Tenth convocation members of the Soviet of Nationalities
Institute of Red Professors alumni
Heroes of Socialist Labour
Recipients of the Order of Friendship of Peoples
Recipients of the Order of Lenin
Recipients of the Order of the Red Banner of Labour
Burials at Metsakalmistu